Eunice Bélidor is a Canadian curator of contemporary art.

Early life and education
Born in Montreal to Haitian immigrant parents, Bélidor completed a BA degree in art history at Concordia University. She later received an M.A in Art History & Visual Culture from York University.

Career
Bélidor was the emerging curator and programming coordinator at Articule Gallery, Montreal, from 2014 to 2019. Following this, she held the position of director of the FOFA gallery at Concordia University. In 2021 she was appointed the curator of Quebec and Canadian Contemporary Art at the Montreal Museum of Fine Arts. Bélidor was the first black curator in the museum's history. She resigned from the museum in January 2023 and has since spoken about the difficulties of being the museum's first black curator and being a "Black Lives Matter hire."

In 2018 she received the TD Bank Group award for emerging curator.

References

External links
Official website

Canadian art curators
Date of birth unknown
Canadian women curators
Black Canadian people
Canadian people of Haitian descent
Living people
1987 births